Cross is an unincorporated community located in rural northwestern Berkeley County, South Carolina, United States. It is centered at the junctions of South Carolina Highway 6 and South Carolina Highway 45. The zip code for Cross is 29436.

The Lawson's Pond Plantation and Loch Dhu are listed on the National Register of Historic Places.

Notable people
Rod Wilson, former NFL linebacker

Notes

Unincorporated communities in South Carolina
Unincorporated communities in Berkeley County, South Carolina